Wheels For Wishes is a non-profit national car donation organization based in Minnetonka, Minnesota which donates its net proceeds to the Make-A-Wish Foundation. Wheels For Wishes is a United States-based 501(c)3 non-profit organization. In 2015, a widely publicized report alleged that only 20% of proceeds were used to support charitable goals.  News reports highlighted the fact that key staffers of Wheels for Wishes (formally, the "Car Donation Foundation") were also owners of two related businesses that were paid a total of $36 million by the charity from 2011 to 2014. At least one report went so far as to call its program "a misleading scam."

Background

Wheels For Wishes is the d/b/a of Car Donation Foundation, a 501(C)3 nonprofit organization that financially supports other charitable organizations through motor vehicle donations. Car Donation Foundation also runs the car donation programs Wheels For Wishes & Wellness and Vehicles For Veterans.

Wheels For Wishes was founded in 2009 by Bill Bigley and Randy Heiligman. It takes donations of cars, boats, motorcycles, RVs and other vehicles.

Work

Donations to Wheels For Wishes benefit the Make-A-Wish Foundation, a multinational organization that provides experiences described as "wishes" to children with life-threatening medical conditions.

The Make-A-Wish Foundation has 62 chapters located throughout the U.S. Wheels For Wishes has a formal partnership with 50 of the 62 Make-A-Wish Foundation Chapters.

The percent of proceeds donated to charity were cited as "better than average" by California newspaper The Orange County Register. Wheels For Wishes had an annual revenue of $31 million, of which 45 percent went to charity.

Controversies

A 2014 compliance report published by the Office of the Minnesota Attorney General identified William Bigley and Randy Heiligman as "running" the Car Donation Foundation (operating as "Wheels for Wishes").  The report alleged that upwards of 78% of proceeds were spent on fundraising and "overhead", and that because of these high overhead costs the charity was placed on South Carolina's "Scrooge List" and Oregon's "Worst Charity List."

This report led to coverage in Consumerist, the Minnesota News Daily, the San Jose Mercury News, the Star Tribune, as well as TV and other outlets.

Shortly after the initial report, the Make-a-Wish Foundation of Minnesota ended its relationship with Wheels for Wishes.  The Make-a-Wish Foundation of Connecticut followed shortly thereafter. However, Connecticut has since renewed their contract with Wheels For Wishes and Make-A-Wish Connecticut currently lists Wheels for Wishes as their exclusive car donation program on their website.

References

External links

• Wheels For Wishes website

• Make-A-Wish Foundation website

Foundations based in the United States
Charities based in Minnesota
Companies based in Minnetonka, Minnesota